Sankaran Krishnaswamy (born 29 July 1959), known as Dr. SK, is an Indian  computational biologist. He was a senior professor at the School of Biotechnology of Madurai Kamaraj University and also a co-ordinator at the Centre of Excellence in Bioinformatics in Madurai Kamaraj University established by Kuppamuthu Dharmalingam. Later he has joined as a visiting scientist of  Institute of Mathematical Sciences at Chennai.

Legacy
Krishnaswamy has pioneered the study on structural biology of membrane proteins in Madurai Kamaraj University. At the turn of the century, several research groups in India were established which made an impact on macromolecular crystallography. The list of scientists who worked as the potential investigators in this context were Shekhar C. Mande from Institute of Microbial Technology (IMTech), Chandigarh, Centre for DNA Fingerprinting and Diagnostics (CDFD), Hyderabad, and National Centre for Cell Science (NCCS), Pune; Amit Prakash Sharma from International Centre for Genetic Engineering and Biotechnology (ICGEB), New Delhi; H.S. Subramanya from Central Drug Research Institute (CDRI), Lucknow; and Rajan Sankaranarayanan from Centre for Cellular and Molecular Biology (CCMB), Hyderabad respectively.

Selected publications
 Ruff M, Krishnaswamy S, Boeglin M, Poterszman A, Mitschler A, Podjarny A, Rees B, Thierry JC, Moras D. 1991. Class II aminoacyl transfer RNA synthetases: crystal structure of yeast aspartyl-tRNA synthetase complexed with tRNAAsp. Science 252: 1682–1689. doi:10.1126/science.2047877
 McKenna R, Xia D, Willingmann P, Ilag LL, Krishnaswamy S, Rossmann MG, Olson NH, Baker TS, Incardona NL. Atomic structure of single-stranded DNA bacteriophage phi X174 and its functional implications. Nature. 1992 Jan 9;355(6356):137-43. doi: 10.1038/355137a0. PMID 1370343; PMCID: PMC4167681.
 G. F. Fabiola, S. Krishnaswamy, V. Nagarajan and V. Pattabhi, Acta Crystallogr. Sect. D, 1997, 53, 316.
 Uma Maheswari, Anton Montsant, Johannes Goll, S. Krishnasamy, K. R. Rajyashri, Villoo Morawala Patell, Chris Bowler, The Diatom EST Database, Nucleic Acids Research, Volume 33, Issue suppl_1, 1 January 2005, Pages D344–D347, https://doi.org/10.1093/nar/gki121
  Krishnaswamy S, Rossmann MG. Structural refinement and analysis of Mengo virus. J Mol Biol 1990; 211:803-44; PMID 2156078; https://doi.org/10.1016/0022-2836(90)90077-y. 1016/0022-2836(90)90077-Y

References 

Living people
Computational biologists
1959 births